The 2009 Formula Renault 3.5 Series was the fifth Formula Renault 3.5 Series season. It began on 18 April at the Circuit de Catalunya and finished on 25 October at the brand-new Ciudad del Motor de Aragón in Alcañiz. It was the fifth season of the Renault-backed single-seater category. International DracoRacing driver Bertrand Baguette won the championship by a comfortable margin, having dominated the second half of the season. His team won their respective championship, ahead of Carlin Motorsport.

Regulation Changes

Technical
After debuting in the 2008 season, the aerodynamics of the current Dallara chassis underwent "minor enhancements inspired by the 2009 F1 regulations".

Sporting
A number of changes were made to the sporting regulations in order to reduce costs and better showcase drivers' talent:

 The Thursday test sessions at each meeting were scrapped, replaced with two one-hour sessions on the Friday.
 The duration of each race was extended to 44 minutes + one lap.
 A bonus point was awarded to the driver who climbed the most places during each race.

In addition, at the halfway point of the season (after the Hungaroring round) the championship leader got the opportunity to demonstrate a Renault R28 F1 car at a World Series meeting. After the seventh race of the season both Marcos Martínez and Bertrand Baguette were tied at the top of the standings, but by virtue of his three race wins, Martínez received the prize drive during the next round at Silverstone.

And just like in previous years, the eventual champion earned a full test with the ING Renault F1 team at the end of the season. Baguette won the title at the Nürburgring, to earn that test with the team.

Teams and drivers
 = Series rookie for 2009

 KTR were due to race with car numbers 25 and 26, however the team pulled out on 1 April 2009 after team boss Kurt Mollekens stated that he was unable to secure a driver line-up for the season. It was announced on 14 May 2009 that KMP Group/SG Formula will take up their entries.

Driver changes
 Changed Teams
 Pasquale Di Sabatino: Red Devil Team Comtec → RC Motorsport
 Esteban Guerrieri: Ultimate Motorsport → RC Motorsport
 Alexandre Marsoin: Epsilon Euskadi → Comtec Racing
 Miguel Molina: Prema Powerteam → Ultimate Motorsport
 Daniil Move: KTR → P1 Motorsport
 Sten Pentus: Red Devil Team Comtec → Mofaz Fortec Motorsport
 James Walker: Fortec Motorsport → P1 Motorsport

 Entering/Re-Entering FR3.5
 Jaime Alguersuari: British F3 (Carlin Motorsport) → Carlin Motorsport
 Jules Bianchi: Formula Three Euroseries (ART Grand Prix) → KMP Group/SG Formula
 Max Chilton: British F3 (Carlin Motorsport) → Comtec Racing
 Dani Clos: GP2 Series (Racing Engineering) → Epsilon Euskadi
 Stefano Coletti: Formula Three Euroseries (Prema Powerteam) → Prema Powerteam
 Chris van der Drift: International Formula Master (JD Motorsport) → Epsilon Euskadi
 Salvador Durán: A1 Grand Prix (A1 Team Mexico) → Interwetten.com
 Brendon Hartley: British F3 (Carlin Motorsport) → Tech 1 Racing
 Tobias Hegewald: Eurocup Formula Renault 2.0 (Motopark Academy) → Interwetten.com
 Michael Herck: GP2 Series (DPR) → Interwetten.com
 Keisuke Kunimoto: Formula Nippon (Team LeMans) → Epsilon Euskadi
 Jon Lancaster: Formula Three Euroseries (ART Grand Prix) → Comtec Racing
 Omar Leal: Euroseries 3000 (Durango) → Prema Powerteam
 Federico Leo: ATS Formel 3 Cup (Ombra Racing) → Pons Racing
 Mihai Marinescu: Formula BMW Europe (FMS International) → Interwetten.com/RC Motorsport
 John Martin: A1 Grand Prix (A1 Team Australia)/British F3 (Räikkönen Robertson Racing) → Comtec Racing
 Greg Mansell: Atlantic Championship (Walker Racing) → USR/Comtec Racing
 Bruno Méndez: European F3 Open Championship (Campos Racing) → RC Motorsport
 Guillaume Moreau: FIA GT Championship (Luc Alphand Aventures) → KMP Group/SG Formula
 Cristiano Morgado: Formula Volkswagen (Morgado Racing) → Comtec Racing
 Edoardo Mortara: GP2 Series (Arden International) → KMP Group/SG Formula & Tech 1 Racing
 Anton Nebylitskiy: Eurocup Formula Renault 2.0 (SG Drivers' Project) → Comtec Racing & KMP Group/SG Formula
 Frankie Provenzano: International Formula Master (ADM Motorsport) → Prema Powerteam
 Daniel Ricciardo: British F3 (Carlin Motorsport) → Tech 1 Racing
 Filip Salaquarda: International Formula Master (ISR Racing) → RC Motorsport
 Harald Schlegelmilch: International Formula Master (Trident Racing) → Comtec Racing
 Oliver Turvey: British F3 (Carlin Motorsport) → Carlin Motorsport
 Alberto Valerio: GP2 Series (Piquet GP) → Comtec Racing
 Adrián Vallés: GP2 Series (BCN Competicion) → Epsilon Euskadi
 Adrian Zaugg: A1 Grand Prix (A1 Team South Africa) → Interwetten.com

 Leaving FR3.5
 Mikhail Aleshin: Carlin Motorsport → FIA Formula Two Championship
 Borja García: RC Motorsport → Atlantic Championship (Condor Motorsports)
 Giedo van der Garde: P1 Motorsport → GP2 Series (iSport International)
 Julien Jousse: Tech 1 Racing → FIA Formula Two Championship
 Pippa Mann: P1 Motorsport → Indy Lights (Panther Racing)
 Mario Romancini: Epsilon Euskadi → Indy Lights (RLR/Andersen Racing)
 Duncan Tappy: RC Motorsport → Indy Lights (Genoa Racing)
 Robert Wickens: Carlin Motorsport → FIA Formula Two Championship

Race calendar and results

Season results
 Points for both championships are awarded as follows:

In addition, a bonus point will be awarded to the driver who climbs the most places in the race order during each race.

The maximum number of points a driver can earn each weekend (except Monaco) is 32 and the maximum number for a team is 57. At Monaco and Portimão, a different point system was implemented, with the qualifying points awarded to each group as there is no Super Pole session.

Drivers' Championship

Teams' Championship

 Polesitter for feature race in bold and is awarded four points. Second and third placed drivers in the Super Pole session receive 2 & 1 points respectively.
 Driver with asterisk recorded fastest lap. No points are awarded.
 Driver who retired but was classified denoted by †.
 Driver who gained most positions in a race in italics, and is awarded one point.

References

External links

Formula Renault 3.5 Series
World Series Formula V8 3.5 seasons
2009 in European sport
Renault 3.5
es:Temporada 2009 de World Series by Renault